The Dominion Farmers' Institute was an investment company formed to erect a suitable building to house central national offices for New Zealand's agricultural, pastoral and horticultural associations and the many other groups involved with work on the land and their many products. Members attended national meetings in Wellington and often made group and individual representations to government ministers.

Description
The site is on Featherston Street, Wellington, the nation's financial centre and yet close to government offices and Parliament. It has frontages to three streets 110-118 Featherston Street and 1, 3 and 5 Maginnity Street and Ballance Street. Construction was first proposed in 1915. Two foundation stones, one each side of the main entry, were laid on 26 July 1917 by the Governor General and The Prime Minister. The architects were Collins and Harman of Christchurch. The reinforced concrete building went up within twelve months erected by Fletcher Brothers later known as Fletcher Construction. It was completed in mid 1918.

"The building provides a large conference hall and committee rooms besides office accommodation. In the ultimate scheme provision is made for a farmers’ club and private hotel where visiting farmers may enjoy all the advantages of social intercourse with their fellows on their visits to the Empire City."

On completion it was claimed to be the largest reinforced concrete building south of the equator. It covers a quarter-acre block with frontages to Featherston, Ballance and Maginnity Streets and contains a total floor area in excess of two acres.

Formally opened 27 May 1919.

Eighteen different farmers' organisations had taken space by the end of 1923. The building's own postal bureau had handled 272,000 letters and 15,400 cablegrams in the last financial year.

The Reserve Bank of New Zealand opened for business on the ground floor of the Dominion Famers' Building on 1 August 1934. On the same day it issued the first New Zealand bank notes replacing those issued by the trading banks. The Reserve Bank remained in the building until its own premises were finished on The Terrace in 1972.

The Dominion Museum's Maori Collection including the Maori House originally built at Turanganui, Poverty Bay were housed in the building from 1924 until the new Dominion Museum was ready to house them.

Facilities
 Conference hall and rooms
 Tea rooms
"In the Dominion Farmers' Institute in downtown Wellington you may see a reconstructed moa on the stair landing."

Tenants
(this list is not complete)
Farmers' organisations
 Dominion Farmers' Union —> New Zealand Farmers' Union —> Federated Farmers of New Zealand
 New Zealand Meat Producers' Board
 New Zealand Fruitgrowers' Federation
 New Zealand Forestry League
 New Zealand Apple and Pear Marketing Board
Government organisations
 Reserve Bank of New Zealand 1934 to 1972
 Department of Agriculture
 New Zealand Forest Service
Commercial organisations
 Farmers Co-operative Wholesale Federation
 New Zealand Dairy Board ??
 New Zealand Farmers' Co-operative Distributing Co
 Canadian National Railways
Other
 Italian Consulate
 Embassy of Belgium

References

Buildings and structures completed in 1918
Heritage New Zealand Category 2 historic places in the Wellington Region
Buildings and structures in Wellington City
1910s architecture in New Zealand